The Simtek S951 was a Formula One car designed by  Nick Wirth and Paul Crooks and used by Simtek for the 1995 season. The number 11 seat was taken by Domenico Schiattarella and the number 12 seat was taken by Jos Verstappen. The team's test driver was Hideki Noda. Noda was set to take the number 11 seat for the second half of the season, but the team folded after round five. The engine was a Ford-Cosworth EDB 3.0l V8. The team's main sponsor was MTV.

Design and construction

The car was designed by Simtek owner and technical director Nick Wirth, along with the chief designer of Simtek Research, Paul Crooks. It was a direct evolution of the 1994 season car, the S941.  In order to secure a firm foothold in the sport following a traumatic season in which Roland Ratzenberger was killed at Imola whilst driving the S941, the team designed the S951 to be straightforward and uncomplicated.

One of the main changes was the change of the engine and gearboxes, as Simtek were given the old Benetton gearbox alongside the Ford-Cosworth EDB engine, which replaced the Ford-Cosworth HB engines.  The Benetton gearboxes were used as part of the team's deal to employ Verstappen, who was loaned from his position as Benetton's test driver.  The S951s were the last cars to be completed of all the 1995 F1 teams' chassis, arriving at the first round of the championship in Brazil with minimal testing.

Racing history
The S951 was much more competitive than the S941 machine, with Verstappen and Schiattarella bringing the car to the finish on several occasions. Verstappen was able to qualify the car in the midfield at several races, his best being fourteenth at Argentina, although he only finished one race due to transmission unreliability.  His best race performance came at the same race, where he ran in sixth place until his gearbox failed. Schiattarella, however, made the end to score the team's highest finish with ninth place.

Wirth revealed at the Monaco round, where both drivers failed to make the race start, that in the eighteen months the team had existed, that had amassed £6 million of debts, partially due to a deal that failed to materialise involving a con. Wirth decided against travelling to the Canadian GP in the hope of securing sponsorship for the next round in France, but this failed. The team went bankrupt and did not compete in any more rounds. The chassis was sold off in an auction in July 1995, with Verstappen's chassis selling for £18,000, with Schiattarella's chassis selling for £16,000.

The S951 car was not used from 1995 until 2006, but two examples of it were used in the 2007 EuroBOSS Championship, with Paul Smith and Peter Alexander driving the chassis.

Complete Formula One results 
(key) (results in bold indicate pole position)

References

Footnotes

Books

External links 
StatsF1 profile (translated)

1995 Formula One season cars
Simtek Formula One cars